Park Kwang-su (born January 22, 1955) is a South Korean filmmaker. He was born in Sokcho, Gangwon Province and grew up in Busan. Park joined the Yallasung Film Group as a student of Fine Arts at Seoul National University. Upon graduation, he founded and led the Seoul Film Group which was dedicated to renewing Korean film culture and closely tied to the student protest movement. The Seoul Film Group was a significant part of the independent film movement and a strong voice speaking out against the military dictatorship. Park studied film at the ESEC film school in Paris, then returned to Korea to work as an assistant director to Lee Chang-Ho. He made his own first feature in 1988, and in 1993 became the first Korean filmmaker to found his own production company.

Park is considered the leader of the "New Korean Cinema" movement and one of Korea's most distinguished filmmakers.  His films have garnered critical acclaim and he has received numerous domestic and international awards for his films.

Influence: the emergence of the New Korean Wave
With the formation of new French and German cultural centers in Seoul, screenings of foreign art films were held, which eventually led to the creation of cinema clubs in which film was discussed and studied.   Names such as Park Kwang-su, Chung Ji-young, Kim Hong-joon, and a number of other directors, producers and film critics were exposed to a world of international cinema and eventually branched off in order to create films and documentaries that showed Korean culture and history through the viewpoint of the people, predominantly the working class.  Some of these short films and documentaries were produced by the Seoul Film Collective which was launched in 1982 and made up of Seoul National University graduates including Park Kwang-su, Jang Sun-woo and other directors.  That Summer (1984), which focused on labourers from rural areas working in Seoul, and Suri-se (1984), which touched upon agricultural issues in southwestern Korea, are just two of the works that the Seoul Film Collective produced.

The New Korean Wave was made possible by two developments: a partial relaxation of censorship and the second change in film policy.  Due to the relaxation of censorship, filmmakers such as Park Kwang-Su had more freedom to produce films that were originally prohibited by the government during the early censorship periods.  The second film policy made it easier for independent producers like Park to enter the Korean film industry.  Rather than trying to fill the “quotas” to produce mediocre Korean films, Park and other independent film producers were able to collaborate on quality films that pushed for social change.  Without these policy changes, Park Kwang-Su would not have been able to make such films such as Chilsu and Mansu, which was a catalyst to the wave of New Korean Cinema.  “While all of Park's movies are firmly rooted in the political history of his country, he belongs to a group of international filmmakers whose work transcends their specific political situations to address, with great artistry, more universal issues of human freedom.”

Filmography
 1988 Chilsu wa Mansu (Chilsu and Mansu)
 1990 Keudeuldo Urichoeroem (Black Republic)
 1991 Berlin Report
 1993 Geuseom e Kago Shipta (To the Starry Island)
 1995 Areumdaun Cheongnyeon Jeon Tae-il (A Single Spark)
 1999 Yi Chae-su ui nan (Uprising)

See also
 Cinema of Korea

External links

Interview with Park Kwang-Su at CineKorea (archived)

Bibliography
 
 

1955 births
Living people
South Korean film directors
People from Sokcho
People from Busan